The 1979 Soviet First League was the ninth season of the Soviet First League and the 39th season of the Soviet second tier league competition.

Final standings

Number of teams by union republic

External links
 1979 season. RSSSF

1979
2
Soviet
Soviet